Mogurnda furva, the black mogurnda, is a species of fish in the family Eleotridae endemic to Lake Kutubu in Papua New Guinea.

References

Mogurnda
Freshwater fish of Papua New Guinea
Taxonomy articles created by Polbot
Fish described in 1986